The legislative districts of Bohol are the representations of the province of Bohol in the various national legislatures of the Philippines. The province is currently represented in the lower house of the Congress of the Philippines through its first, second, and third congressional districts.

History 
Bohol had been divided into three congressional districts since 1907, although the district configurations were altered with the restoration of the House of Representatives in 1987. It was part of the representation of Region VII from 1978 to 1984, and from 1984 to 1986 it elected three assemblymen at-large.

1st District 

City: Tagbilaran
Municipalities: Alburquerque, Antequera, Baclayon, Balilihan, Calape, Catigbian, Corella, Cortes, Dauis, Loon, Maribojoc, Panglao, Sikatuna, Tubigon
Population (2015):  443,038

1907–1972 

Municipalities: Antequera, Baclayon, Balilihan, Calape, Corella, Cortes, Dauis, Loon, Maribojoc, Panglao, Tagbilaran (became city 1966), San Isidro (established 1969)

2nd District 

Municipalities: Bien Unido (established 1981), Buenavista, Clarin, Dagohoy, Danao, Getafe, Inabanga, Pres. Carlos P. Garcia, Sagbayan, San Isidro, San Miguel, Talibon, Trinidad, Ubay
Population (2015):  439,771

Notes

1907–1972 

Municipalities: Alburquerque, Batuan, Bilar, Carmen, Dimiao, Inabanga, Loay, Loboc, Sevilla, Tubigon, Lila (re-established 1915), Sikatuna (re-established 1917), Clarin (established 1919), Sagbayan (Borja) (established 1949), Catigbian (San Jacinto) (re-established 1949)

3rd District 

Municipalities: Alicia, Anda, Batuan, Bilar, Candijay, Carmen, Dimiao, Duero, Garcia Hernandez, Guindulman, Jagna, Lila, Loay, Loboc, Mabini, Pilar, Sevilla, Sierra Bullones, Valencia
Population (2015):  430,751

1907–1972 

Municipalities: Anda, Candijay, Duero, Garcia-Hernandez, Guindulman, Jagna, Jetafe, Mabini, Sierra Bullones, Talibon, Ubay, Valencia, Trinidad (Ipil) (re-established 1947), Alicia (Batuanan) (re-established 1949), Dagohoy (established 1956), Buenavista (established 1959), Pilar (established 1960), San Miguel (established 1961), Danao (established 1961), Pitogo (established 1969)

Notes

At-Large (defunct)

1943-1944

1984-1986

References 

Bohol
Politics of Bohol